Parapercis striolata is a fish species in the sandperch family, Pinguipedidae. It is found in the Western Central Pacific from Japan to Australia and in the Eastern Indian Ocean from Australia and Indonesia. This species can reach a length of  TL.

References

Randall, J.E., 2001. Pinguipedidae (= Parapercidae, Mugiloididae). Sandperches. p. 3501-3510. In K.E. Carpenter and V. Niem (eds.) FAO species identification guide for fishery purposes. The living marine resources of the Western Central Pacific. Vol. 6. Bony fishes part 4 (Labridae to Latimeriidae), estuarine crocodiles. FAO, Rome.

Pinguipedidae
Taxa named by Max Carl Wilhelm Weber
Fish described in 1913
Fish of the Indian Ocean
Fish of the Pacific Ocean
Fish of Australia